The Laing Art Gallery in Newcastle upon Tyne, England, is located on New Bridge Street West. The gallery was designed in the Baroque style with Art Nouveau elements by architects Cackett & Burns Dick and is now a Grade II listed building.  It was opened in 1904 and is now managed by Tyne & Wear Archives & Museums and sponsored by the Department for Culture, Media and Sport. In front of the gallery is the Blue Carpet. The building, which was financed by a gift from a local wine merchant, Alexander Laing, is Grade II listed.

The gallery collection contains paintings, watercolours and decorative historical objects, including Newcastle silver. In the early 1880s, Newcastle was a major glass producer in the world and enamelled glasses by William Beilby are on view along with ceramics (including Maling pottery), and diverse contemporary works by emerging UK artists. It has a programme of regularly rotating exhibitions and has free entry.

The gallery's collection of paintings includes John Martin's dramatic The Destruction of Sodom and Gomorrah, as well as works by Sir Joshua Reynolds, Edward Burne-Jones (Laus Veneris), Isabella and the Pot of Basil from 1868 by William Holman Hunt, and Ben Nicholson. Local paintings include pictures by Ralph Hedley. There is also a collection of 18th- and 19th-century watercolours and drawings, including work by J. M. W. Turner and John Sell Cotman.

References

External links
Laing Art Gallery at Tyne & Wear Archives & Museums site
Geolocated 3D Google Earth model of the Laing Art Gallery
Virtual tour of the Laing Art Gallery provided by Google Arts & Culture

Culture in Newcastle upon Tyne
Tyne & Wear Archives & Museums
Art museums and galleries in Tyne and Wear
Museums in Newcastle upon Tyne
Decorative arts museums in England
Art museums established in 1904
1904 establishments in England
History of Newcastle upon Tyne
Grade II listed buildings in Tyne and Wear